The flag of Maranhão was created by Joaquim de Sousa Andrade. The flag consists of nine stripes in a horizontal direction, interspersed, four white, three red and two black, with a blue canton occupying a third of the length of the flag and half of its width, in the top left with a white star in the center. The three colors of the stripes represent the ethnic composition of the population of Maranhão (Indigenous, black, and white people), while the star represents Beta Scorpii, which inturn represents the state of Maranhão on the Flag of Brazil.

History

References

Maranhão
Flags introduced in 1889
1889 establishments in Brazil
Maranhão